The 1975 NCAA Men's Division I Swimming and Diving Championships were contested in March 1975 at the Cleveland State University Natatorium at Cleveland State University in Cleveland, Ohio at the 52nd annual NCAA-sanctioned swim meet to determine the team and individual national champions of Division I men's collegiate swimming and diving in the United States. 

USC again topped the team standings, the Trojans' second consecutive title and seventh overall.

Team standings
Note: Top 10 only
(H) = Hosts
(DC) = Defending champions
Full results

See also
List of college swimming and diving teams

References

NCAA Division I Men's Swimming and Diving Championships
NCAA Division I Swimming And Diving Championships
NCAA Division I Swimming And Diving Championships